The men's modern pentathlon at the 2000 Summer Olympics in Sydney was held on 30 September. Three venues were used: The Dome and Exhibition Complex (fencing and shooting), Sydney International Aquatic Centre (swimming) and Sydney Baseball Stadium (horse-riding and cross-country running). Dmitry Svatkovsky from Russia won the gold medal with a score of 5,376 points.

Competition format
The modern pentathlon consisted of five events, with all five held in one day.

 Shooting: A 4.5 mm air pistol shooting (the athlete must hit 20 shots, one at each target). Score was based on the number of shots hitting at each target.
 Fencing: A round-robin, one-touch épée competition. Score was based on winning percentage.
 Swimming: A 200 m freestyle race. Score was based on time.
 Horse-riding: A show jumping competition. Score based on penalties for fallen bars, refusals, falls, and being over the time limit.
 Running: A 3 km run.  Starts are staggered (based on points from first four events), so that the first to cross the finish line wins.

Schedule
All times are Australian Time (UTC+10)

Results
Twenty-four athletes participated.

References

External links
Official Results
ESPN Olympics Coverage – Sydney 2000

Modern pentathlon at the 2000 Summer Olympics
Men's events at the 2000 Summer Olympics